The Landtag of Saxony, also known in English as the Saxon State Parliament, is the legislature of the Free State of Saxony, one of Germany's sixteen states. It is responsible for legislation, control of the government, and electing some state officials. The Landtag has existed in various forms since 1831, but the current body was established during German reunification in 1990. The Landtag is directly elected and has a term of five years.

Powers
As the legislative body of the Free State of Saxony, the Landtag is responsible for drafting and passing laws, including the state budget, as well as overseeing the activities of the state government and electing the Minister-President, the head of government.

Draft laws may be introduced to the Landtag in various ways: by the proposal of at least six members, by any parliamentary group, by the state government, or by public petition. Draft laws are first sent by the President of the Landtag to a relevant committee, which considers the draft law and makes any amendments it considers necessary. The committee then submits a report to the Landtag recommending either its adoption or its rejection. The Landtag then debates and votes on the law. If it is adopted, it is submitted to the Minister-President and the relevant state minister for countersigning. It is then promulgated by the state government and enters into force.

As Saxony has a parliamentary system, the state government is reliant on the confidence of the Landtag in order to serve. The Landtag is thus responsible for oversight of the government. The state constitution declares that the Landtag has a comprehensive right to question the government, who must respond to inquiries from parliamentary groups or individual Landtag members. Parliamentary groups may request debates on issues of relevance in the plenary, at which the state government is obliged to speak. Standing committees may also demand the presence of members of the state government to give statements.

The first responsibility of the Landtag during each legislative period is the election of its presiding officer, the President of the Landtag, as well as the Vice-Presidents of the Landtag. The Landtag also elects the head of the state government, the Minister-President. The Minister-President must win an absolute majority of votes to be elected in the first round of voting; if no candidate achieves this, a simple majority suffices in further rounds. The Minister-President is then responsible for the appointment of the state cabinet. The Landtag also elects a number of other state offices, including the Commissioner for Data Protection, the Commissioner for Coming to Terms with the SED Dictatorship, the Commissioner for Foreigners, the President of the Saxon Court of Auditors, and the members of the Saxon Constitutional Court.

History
Some form of an assembly has existed in the state's predecessors since the Saxon House of Wettin was enfeoffed with the Margraviate of Meissen in 1089. The local ministeriales regularly met with the Wettin margraves, consulting but also defending the interests of their own region. By the time Meissen was elevated to the Electorate of Saxony by the Golden Bull of 1356, the noble representatives of the estates formed a permanent advisory board. With the deputies of the Saxon cities, these Landstände councils gradually obtained a considerable voice until the 15th century: mainly in fiscal and military policies, later also in religious matters concerning the Protestant Reformation.

Kingdom of Saxony

A modern-style bicameral constitutionally-based legislature was introduced in the Kingdom of Saxony in September 1831. In the wake of the tumultuous 1848 revolutions, Saxony's Landtag extended voting rights (though still maintaining property requirements) and abolished poll taxes. In 1871, Saxony was incorporated into the German Empire, and more voting rights were gradually extended.

Upon the introduction of universal male suffrage in 1909, the number of eligible voters almost tripled – from 264,000 in 1907 to 773,000 – and turnout increased dramatically (from 48% to 82%). The influx of previously disenfranchised working-class voters allowed the Social Democratic Party (SPD) to win substantial representation for the first time since the 1890s, splitting the hitherto stable National Liberal/Conservative party system.

Free State

After the First World War and the German Revolution of 1918–1919, Saxony was re-established as a republic, adopting its modern title of "Free State". During the Weimar Republic period, Saxon politics were dominated by the Social Democratic Party (SPD), with the German National People's Party (DNVP), the Communist Party (KPD), the German People's Party (DVP), and later the Wirtschaftspartei (WP) maintaining a significant presence. From 1926 onward, a series of right-wing coalition governments were led successively by the small Old Social Democratic Party (ASPD), the DVP, and the DNVP. After the Nazi seizure of power in 1933, the government passed the "Law on the Reconstruction of the Reich" (30 January 1934) that abolished all the state Landtage.

The Landtag was de facto re-established in the Soviet occupation zone in 1946, later becoming part of the German Democratic Republic (East Germany). It functioned until its abolition in 1952, during which time it was dominated by the Socialist Unity Party (SED).

The Landtag was formally re-established again upon Germany's legal reunification on 3 October 1990. It was elected on 14 October, and its inaugural sitting took place on 27 October. Since 1990, the Christian Democratic Union (CDU) has always been the largest party; it held an absolute majority of seats until 2004.

Electoral system

Elections to the Landtag are conducted via mixed-member proportional representation using closed party lists. Voters have two votes: a "first vote" for a directly-elected representative from one of a number of single-member constituencies, and a "second vote" for a party list. In order to qualify for representation, a party must either gain 5% of the statewide list vote or win at least two constituencies. First-past-the-post voting is used for single-member constituencies, and the overall seat distribution is determined using the D'Hondt method.

In the case of overhang seats, the total number of seats in the Landtag is increased from the standard 120 (60 constituency seats and 60 party list seats) until no overhang seats remain, i.e. the number of leveling seats added is equal to the original number of overhang seats.

There is also a provision ensuring that, if a party wins an absolute majority of party votes but does not win an absolute majority of seats, an extra seat is awarded to that party at the expense of the other parties.

Current composition

2019 state election 

AfD received its highest share of the vote in any state or federal election, while the CDU and The Left both fell to record lows in Saxony. Under normal circumstances AfD should have received 39 seats in the Landtag; however, due to positions 31–61 in their party list being ruled invalid and removed from the list, they had no candidates to fill the final seat. Thus, it remains vacant and there are only 119 members of the Landtag, one fewer than the standard minimum size.
The CDU formed a government coalition with the Greens and the SPD.

| colspan=13 align=center| 
|-
! rowspan=2 colspan=2| Party
! colspan=4| Constituency
! colspan=4| Party list
! rowspan=2| Totalseats
! rowspan=2| +/-
! rowspan=2| Seats %
|-
! Votes
! % 
! +/-
! Seats 
! Votes
! % 
! +/-
! Seats 
|-
| bgcolor=| 
| align=left| Christian Democratic Union (CDU)
| 703,006
| 32.5
| 7.2
| 41
| 695,560
| 32.1
| 7.3
| 4
| 45
| 14
| 37.8
|-
| bgcolor=| 
| align=left| Alternative for Germany (AfD)
| 613,585
| 28.4
| 22.0
| 15
| 595,671
| 27.5
| 17.7
| 23
| 38
| 24
| 31.9
|-
| bgcolor=| 
| align=left| The Left (Die Linke)
| 265,871
| 12.3
| 8.7
| 1
| 224,354
| 10.4
| 8.5
| 13
| 14
| 13
| 11.8
|-
| bgcolor=| 
| align=left| Alliance 90/The Greens (Grüne)
| 192,489
| 8.9
| 2.6
| 3
| 187,015
| 8.6
| 2.9
| 9
| 12
| 4
| 10.1
|-
| bgcolor=| 
| align=left| Social Democratic Party (SPD)
| 166,920
| 7.7
| 5.5
| 0
| 167,289
| 7.7
| 4.6
| 10
| 10
| 8
| 8.4
|-
! colspan=13|
|-
| bgcolor=| 
| align=left| Free Democratic Party (FDP)
| 100,639
| 4.7
| 0.6
| 0
| 97,438
| 4.5
| 0.7
| 0
| 0
| ±0
| 0
|-
| bgcolor=| 
| align=left| Free Voters (FW)
| 98,353
| 4.6
| 2.6
| 0
| 72,897
| 3.4
| 1.8
| 0
| 0
| ±0
| 0
|-
| bgcolor=| 
| align=left| Die PARTEI (PARTEI)
| 12,557
| 0.6
| 0.4
| 0
| 33,618
| 1.6
| 0.9
| 0
| 0
| ±0
| 0
|-
| bgcolor=| 
| align=left| Human Environment Animal Protection (Tierschutz)
| –
| –
| 0.0
| –
| 33,476
| 1.5
| 0.4
| 0
| 0
| ±0
| 0
|-
| bgcolor=| 
| align=left| National Democratic Party (NPD)
| –
| –
| 0.0
| –
| 12,947
| 0.6
| 4.3
| 0
| 0
| ±0
| 0
|-
| bgcolor=black| 
| align=left| Partei für Gesundheitsforschung 
| –
| –
| New
| –
| 11,652
| 0.5
| New
| 0
| 0
| New
| 0
|-
| bgcolor=| 
| align=left| Blaue #TeamPetry Thüringen
| 1,508
| 0.1
| New
| 0
| 7,806
| 0.4
| New
| 0
| 0
| New
| 0
|-
| bgcolor=| 
| align=left| Pirate Party Germany (Piraten)
| –
| –
| 1.6
| –
| 6,632
| 0.3
| 0.8
| 0
| 0
| ±0
| 0
|-
| bgcolor=| 
| align=left| Ecological Democratic Party (ÖDP)
| –
| –
| 
| –
| 6,000
| 0.3
| 0.3
| 0
| 0
| ±0
| 0
|-
| bgcolor=#110077| 
| align=left| Party of Humanists (Humanisten)
| –
| –
| New
| –
| 4,305
| 0.2
| New
| 0
| 0
| New
| 0
|-
| 
| align=left| Dawn of German Patriots – Middle Germany (ADPM)
| –
| –
| New
| –
| 3,948
| 0.2
| New
| 0
| 0
| New
| 0
|-
| bgcolor=#005488| 
| align=left| Party of Reason (PDV)
| –
| –
| 
| –
| 2,268
| 0.1
| 0.1
| 0
| 0
| ±0
| 0
|-
| bgcolor=#FF0000| 
| align=left| Communist Party of Germany (KPD)
| –
| –
| 
| –
| 1,951
| 0.1
| 0.1
| 0
| 0
| ±0
| 0
|-
| 
| align=left| Bürgerrechtsbewegung Solidarität (BüSo)
| –
| –
| 0.4
| –
| 1,630
| 0.1
| 0.1
| 0
| 0
| ±0
| 0
|-
| bgcolor=| 
| align=left| Other
| 2,732
| 0.1
| 
| 0
| –
| –
| –
| –
| 0
| ±0
| 0
|-
! colspan=2| Valid votes
! 2,159,850
! 98.7
! 
! 
! 2,166,457
! 99.0
! 
! 
! 
! 
! 
|-
! colspan=2| Blank and invalid votes
! 28,636
! 1.3
! 
! 
! 22,029
! 1.0
! 
! 
! 
! 
! 
|-
! colspan=2| Total
! 2,188,486
! 100.0
! 
! 60
! 2,188,486
! 100.0
! 
! 59
! 119
! 7
! 
|-
! colspan=2| Electorate/voter turnout
! 3,288,643
! 66.5
!  17.4
! 
! 3,288,643
! 66.5
!  17.4
! 
! 
! 
! 
|-
| colspan=13| Source: Statistisches Landesamt des Freistaates Sachsen
|}

Historical composition

Members of the state government

See also
List of presidents of the Landtag of Saxony

References

Saxony
Politics of Saxony